Anerastia lavatella is a species of snout moth in the genus Anerastia. It was described by Zerny, in 1917, and is known from Sudan.

References

Moths described in 1917
Anerastiini
Moths of Africa